Gemtuzumab ozogamicin, sold under the brand name Mylotarg, is an antibody-drug conjugate (a drug-linked monoclonal antibody) that is used to treat acute myeloid leukemia.

The most common grade 3 and higher adverse reactions that occurred during Induction 1 and Intensification 2 in ≥ 5% of people who received gemtuzumab ozogamicin were infection, febrile neutropenia, decreased appetite, hyperglycemia, mucositis, hypoxia, hemorrhage, increased transaminase, diarrhea, nausea, and hypotension.

Medical uses 
In the United States, gemtuzumab ozogamicin is indicated for newly diagnosed CD33-positive acute myeloid leukemia (AML) for adults and children one month and older and for the treatment of relapsed or refractory CD33-positive AML in adults and children two years and older.

Mechanism and side effects
Gemtuzumab is a monoclonal antibody to CD33 linked to a cytotoxic agent from the class of calicheamicins (ozogamicin). CD33 is expressed in most leukemic blast cells but also in normal hematopoietic cells, the intensity diminishing with maturation of stem cells.

Common side effects of administration included shivering, fever, nausea and vomiting. Serious side effects included severe myelosuppression (suppressed activity of bone marrow, which is involved in formation of various blood cells [found in 98% of patients]), disorder of the respiratory system, tumor lysis syndrome, Type III hypersensitivity, venous occlusion, and death.

History
Gemtuzumab ozogamicin was created in a collaboration between Celltech and Wyeth that began in 1991.  The same collaboration later produced inotuzumab ozogamicin.  Celltech was acquired by UCB in 2004  and Wyeth was acquired by Pfizer in 2009.

In the United States, it was approved under an accelerated-approval process by the FDA in 2000, for use in patients over the age of 60 with relapsed acute myelogenous leukemia (AML); or those who are not considered candidates for standard chemotherapy.
The accelerated approval was based on the surrogate endpoint of response rate.  It was the first antibody-drug conjugate to be approved.

Within the first year after approval, the FDA required a black box warning be added to gemtuzumab packaging.  The drug was noted to increase the risk of veno-occlusive disease in the absence of bone marrow transplantation.  Later the onset of VOD was shown to occur at increased frequency in gemtuzumab patients even following bone marrow transplantation. The drug was discussed in a 2008 JAMA article, which criticized the inadequacy of postmarketing surveillance  of biologic agents.

A randomized Phase III comparative controlled trial (SWOG S0106) was initiated in 2004, by Wyeth in accordance with the FDA accelerated-approval process.  The study was stopped on August 20, 2009, prior to completion due to worrisome outcomes.  Among the patients evaluated for early toxicity, fatal toxicity rate was significantly higher in the gemtuzumab combination therapy group vs the standard therapy group. Mortality was 5.7% with gemtuzumab and 1.4% without the agent (16/283 = 5.7% vs 4/281 = 1.4%; P = .01).

In June 2010, Pfizer withdrew Mylotarg from the market at the request of the US FDA.  However, some other regulatory authorities did not agree with the FDA decision, with Japan's Pharmaceuticals and Medical Devices Agency stating in 2011 that the "risk-benefit balance of gemtuzumab ozogamicin has not changed from its state at the time of approval".

In 2017, Pfizer reapplied for US and EU approval, based on a meta-analysis of prior trials and results of the ALFA-0701 clinical trial, an open-label Phase III trial in 280 older people with AML. In September 2017, gemtuzumab ozogamicin was approved again for use in the United States and in the European Union.

See also
 Inotuzumab ozogamicin

References

Further reading

External links
 
 

Antibody-drug conjugates
Hepatotoxins
Monoclonal antibodies for tumors
Orphan drugs
Pfizer brands
Withdrawn drugs
Wyeth brands